Dichagyris musiva is a moth of the family Noctuidae. It is found in some mountainous areas of Europe, Turkey, Armenia, the Caucasus, Anatolia, southern Siberia, Mongolia, Tibet and western China.

Description

The wingspan is 38–44 mm. Warren (1914) states R. musiva Hbn. (8f). Forewing grey-brown with a reddish tint; costal area broadly cream-white to outer line; the edges of the two stigmata also cream-white, ' their centres grey; the cell and a blotch below it at base black brown, like the upper part of shoulders; lines all indistinct; hindwing cream-white, the veins and apex grey; fringe yellowish white. In Europe this species extends from S. Russia through Hungary. Austria and Germany to Switzerland and is wide spread through Asia, occurring in Armenia and Asia Minor, in the Altai Alts, in Siberia, W. and E. Turkestan, Mongolia and Amurland. Larva mottled yellowish brown and dark, with oblique subdorsal streaks; the lines dark; on various lower plants.

Biology
Adults are on wing from June to September depending on the location.

The larvae feed on various herbaceous plants, including Cichorium intybus, Galium mollugo, Arabis hirsuta and Taraxacum species.

References

External links

 "Dichagyris musiva (Hübner, [1803])" at Markku Savela's Lepidoptera and Some Other Life Forms (Funet)
Lepiforum.de

musiva
Moths of Europe
Moths of Asia
Taxa named by Jacob Hübner
Moths described in 1803